Twin Rocks is an unincorporated community in Tillamook County, Oregon, United States, on the Oregon Coast. Twin Rocks post office was established in 1914, with William E. Dunsmoor as the first postmaster. The post office closed in 1954.

Twin Rocks is near two other unincorporated communities in Tillamook County, Barview and Watseco. The three communities are all along a  stretch of U.S. Route 101 between the cities of Rockaway Beach and Garibaldi.

Twin Rocks Friends Camp in the community was founded in 1918.

References

External links

1914 establishments in Oregon
Seaside resorts in Oregon
Unincorporated communities in Oregon
Unincorporated communities in Tillamook County, Oregon